FUBIMINA (also known as BIM-2201, BZ-2201 and FTHJ) is a synthetic cannabinoid that is the benzimidazole analog of AM-2201 and has been used as an active ingredient in synthetic cannabis products. It was first identified in Japan in 2013, alongside MEPIRAPIM.

FUBIMINA acts as a reasonably potent agonist for the CB2 receptor (Ki = 23.45 nM), with 12x selectivity over CB1 (Ki = 296.1 nM), and does not fully substitute for Δ9-THC in rat discrimination studies.

Related benzimidazole derivatives have been reported to be highly selective agonists for the CB2 receptor.

See also
 AM-694
 AM-1235
 AM-2232
 AM-2233
 BIM-018
 JWH-018
 List of AM cannabinoids
 List of JWH cannabinoids
 THJ-2201

References

Benzimidazoles
Cannabinoids
Designer drugs
Organofluorides
1-Naphthyl compounds